Astrophytum coahuilense is a cactus species belonging to the genus Astrophytum. It is native to Mexico, specifically the south-western regions of Coahuila and Durango. Although superficially similar to A. myriostigma, the two species bear different flowers, fruits and seeds. Astrophytum coahuilense can be grown from seeds and, though they tend to be slow growing, are amenable to botanical cultivation.

References 

coahuilense
Plants described in 1932